Grigoris Bithikotsis (Greek Γρηγόρης Μπιθικώτσης, ; December 11, 1922 – April 7, 2005) was a Greek folk singer/songwriter with a career spanning five decades. He is considered one of the most important figures in Greek popular music.

Biography
Bithikotsis was born in Peristeri, Athens, in 1922 to a poor family. He became interested in music at an early age, and acquired a  bouzouki as soon as he was able.  At first, he had to hide the instrument at a friend's house and practice in secret, as his father disapproved of the new rembetiko style that had captured his son's interest.

He met composer Mikis Theodorakis in 1959 and the two collaborated producing folk songs. Bithikotsis composed over 80 songs, including: Stu Belami to ouzeri and Tou Votanikou o magas. He possessed a rich singing voice with which he performed his own compositions and those of Theodorakis, who frequently chose his friend Grigoris to perform his masterpieces. The two contributed greatly to the then-emerging  laika style of Greek music.
 
A leftist, he was exiled to the island of Makronisos in the 1950s during the reign of King Paul.

Throughout his life, Bithikotsis performed frequent concerts at numerous venues, including one in Athens upon the occasion of his eightieth birthday. He died in Athens, in 2005, following three months of hospitalization. His funeral was attended by thousands, including representatives of all the Greek political parties.

Discography
Na 'tane to '21 [1930]
Epitafios [1960]
Politeia A [1961]
To tragoudi tou nekrou aderfou [1962]
Epifania [1962]
To Axion Esti [1964]
Politeia B [1964]
Romiosini [1966]
14 Hryses Epityhies N1 (14 Greatest Hits Vol. 1) [1977]
14 Hryses Epityhies N2 (14 Greatest Hits Vol. 2) [1977]
1950-1962 Compilation
1963-1971 Compilation
36 Hronia (36 Years)
Apo tis 45 Strofes No. 4
Alpha – Omega [1971]
Chamenes Agapes (Lost Loves) [1977]
I Ellada tou Grigori (The Greece of Grigoris)
Episimi Agapimeni (Best Loved Songs)
Gia panta No. 1 (Forever #1)
Gia ton Grigori – I Synavlia to Stadio Erininis kai Filias (For Grigoris, in Peace and Friendship Stadium)
Mazi (with Stelios Kazantzidis) 
Mazi me ton Grigori (Together with Grigoris)
Megaloprepeia
Mia gynaika fevgei (One Woman Leaves) [1969]
Oktovriou 1978/October 1978 - with Mikis Theodorakis [1978]
O Agnostos Theos (Strange God) [1970]
Oi Magalyteres Epityhies Tou (His Greatest Hits)
Ouranio Toxo (Rainbow)
Prasino fos (Green Light) [1973]
Sti Megali Leoforo  (On the Broad Avenue)
Stratos Dionysiou/Ta zebekika tou Grigori kai tou Stratou (with Stratos Dionysiou) 
Ta Afthentika No.2 [1984]
Apo tous thisayrous ton 45 Strofon (with Vicky Moscholiou) 
Tragoudia apo tis 45 Srtrofes

References

External links
Obituary in Kathimerini
Se toyto to steno (Audio file)
Enas alitis pethane (20:40) (Audio file)

1922 births
2005 deaths
20th-century Greek male singers
Greek laïko singers
Greek rebetiko singers
Greek singer-songwriters
Gold Crosses of the Order of the Phoenix (Greece)
Singers from Athens